In modern usage, the term grammatology refers to the scientific study of writing systems or scripts. This usage was first elucidated in English by  linguist Ignace Gelb in his 1952 book A Study of Writing. The equivalent word is recorded in German and French use long before then. Grammatology can examine the typology of scripts, the analysis of the structural properties of scripts, and the relationship between written and spoken language.  In its broadest sense, some scholars also include the study of literacy in grammatology and, indeed, the impact of writing on philosophy, religion, science, administration and other aspects of the organization of society.
Historian Bruce Trigger associates grammatology with cultural evolution.

Toronto School of communication theory 

The scholars most immediately associated with grammatology, understood as the history and theory of writing, include Eric Havelock (The Muse Learns to Write), Walter J. Ong (Orality and Literacy), Jack Goody (Domestication of the Savage Mind), and Marshall McLuhan (The Gutenberg Galaxy). Grammatology brings to any topic a consideration of the contribution of technology and the material and social apparatus of language. A more theoretical treatment of the approach may be seen in the works of Friedrich Kittler (Discourse Networks: 1800/1900) and Avital Ronell (The Telephone Book).

Structuralism and Deconstruction 
Swiss linguist Ferdinand de Saussure, who is considered to be a key figure in structural approaches to language, saw speech and writing as 'two distinct systems of signs' with the second having 'the sole purpose of representing the first.', a view further explained in Peter Barry's the Beginning Theory. In the 1960s, with the writings Roland Barthes and Jacques Derrida, critiques have been put forth to this proposed relation. Barthes' writing has been described  as interesting as one can see the transition of these two literary styles through comparing his earlier works with his later work. His early work is methodical and very structured in its delivery, with his later works becoming random in sequence and unfocused. Meanwhile, Jacques Derrida published many works on the subject of literary theory but most are considered  to be more philosophical than based on literature itself.

In 1967, Jacques Derrida borrowed the term, but put it to different use, in his book Of Grammatology. Derrida aimed to show that writing is not simply a reproduction of speech, but that the way in which thoughts are recorded in writing strongly affects the nature of knowledge. Deconstruction from a grammatological perspective places the history of philosophy in general, and metaphysics in particular, in the context of writing as such. In this perspective metaphysics is understood as a category or classification system relative to the invention of alphabetic writing and its institutionalization in School. Plato's Academy, and Aristotle's Lyceum, are as much a part of the invention of literacy as is the introduction of the vowel to create the Classical Greek alphabet. Gregory Ulmer took up this trajectory, from historical to philosophical grammatology, to add applied grammatology (Applied Grammatology:  Post(e)-Pedagogy from Jacques Derrida to Joseph Beuys, Johns Hopkins, 1985). Ulmer coined the term "electracy" to call attention to the fact that digital technologies and their elaboration in new media forms are part of an apparatus that is to these inventions what literacy is to alphabetic and print technologies. Grammatology studies the invention of an apparatus across the spectrum of its manifestations—technology, institutional practices, and identity behaviors.

See also

Notes

References 

 
Semiotics
Post-structuralism
Postmodernism
Jacques Derrida